Tat-Siong Benny Liew is a Chinese-American New Testament scholar.

Biography 
Liew obtained his BA and MA from Olivet Nazarene University and completed a PhD in New Testament from Vanderbilt University. He taught New Testament at Chicago Theological Seminary and Pacific School of Theology and, in Autumn 2013, took up the 1956 Chair of New Testament Studies in the religious studies department of College of the Holy Cross.

Much of his scholarship is around New Testament studies, related to the gospels, and for promoting Asian American biblical hermeneutics.

Controversy 
In 2018, the college's alternative newspaper, the Fenwick Review, published extracts of Liew's scholarship which suggested that Jesus had "queer desires." Though this was seen as controversial, given that Holy Cross is a Jesuit institution, Liew was defended by the president Philip Burroughs on the basis of academic freedom. Nevertheless, this led to a petition of 14,000 signatures demanding his dismissal, and an open letter written by Robert J. McManus, the Catholic bishop of Worcester, declaring Liew's views blasphemous and stating "academic freedom… particularly in the fields of theology or religious studies, cannot provide cover for blatantly unorthodox teaching."

Works

References 

Living people
American people of Chinese descent
American biblical scholars
New Testament scholars
Vanderbilt University alumni
College of the Holy Cross faculty
Year of birth missing (living people)